A partial lunar eclipse took place on Monday, April 4, 1977, the first of two lunar eclipses in 1977. At maximum eclipse, a small bite out of the Moon should have been visible. The eclipse lasted for 1 hour and 34.76 minutes, with just 19.289% of the Moon in shadow at maximum.

Visibilility
It was completely visible over North America, South America, Europe and Asia, seen rising over the Pacific and setting over the Middle East.

Related lunar eclipses

Eclipses in 1977 
 A partial lunar eclipse on Monday, 4 April 1977.
 An annular solar eclipse on Monday, 18 April 1977.
 A penumbral lunar eclipse on Tuesday, 27 September 1977.
 A total solar eclipse on Wednesday, 12 October 1977.

Lunar year series

Saros series

Half-Saros cycle
A lunar eclipse will be preceded and followed by solar eclipses by 9 years and 5.5 days (a half saros). This lunar eclipse is related to two partial solar eclipses of Solar Saros 119.

See also 
List of lunar eclipses
List of 20th-century lunar eclipses

Notes

External links 
 

1977-04
1977 in science
April 1977 events